Andrzej Popiel (24 January 1936 – 17 February 2020) was a Polish stage actor. He sporadically appeared in films and TV series.

He was a son of Kazimierz Popiel and Anna Latinik, and a grandson of Polish Army general Franciszek Latinik.

He was awarded the Brown Medal of Merit for National Defence (1971) and Silver Cross of Merit (1989).

Theatre (selection) 
 1961: Wesoły telewizor (Estrada Kraków)
 1973: Kariera Nikodema Dyzmy (The Career of Nicodemus Dyzma, Music Theatre in Łódź) as Litwinek
 1975, 1983: Madame Sans-Gene (Music Theatre in Gdynia) as Kirkeby
 1984: Fiddler on the Roof (Music Theatre in Gdynia, directed by Jerzy Gruza) as a rabbi
 1991: Pan Tadeusz (Municipal Theatre in Gdynia, directed by Adam Hanuszkiewicz) as a chamberlain
 1993: Fiddler on the Roof (Grand Theatre in Warsaw, directed by Jerzy Gruza) as a rabbi

Filmography 
 1984: Smażalnia story
 1986: Na kłopoty Bednarski (TV)
 2002, 2003: Lokatorzy (TV)
 2004, 2007: Sąsiedzi (TV)
 2006: Outlanders

References 

 

Polish male stage actors
1936 births
2020 deaths
Recipients of the Silver Cross of Merit (Poland)
Recipient of the Meritorious Activist of Culture badge